The 1981 FA Cup final was the 100th final of the FA Cup, and was contested by Tottenham Hotspur and Manchester City.

The original match took place on Saturday 9 May 1981 at Wembley, and finished 1–1 after extra-time. Tommy Hutchison opened the scoring for City in the 30th minute, but scored an own-goal in the 79th minute to bring Spurs level.

The replay took place five days later on Thursday 14 May 1981, and was the first replay since 1970 and the first to be staged at Wembley. Ricky Villa opened the scoring for Spurs in the eighth minute, before Steve MacKenzie equalised for City three minutes later. A Kevin Reeves penalty five minutes into the second half put the Manchester side ahead, before Garth Crooks brought Spurs level again in the 70th minute. Then, in the 76th minute, Tony Galvin passed to Villa 30 yards from City's goal, and the Argentinian proceeded to skip past four defenders before slotting the ball past City goalkeeper Joe Corrigan. This goal was voted Wembley Goal of the Century in 2001, and it won Tottenham the match, 3–2, and the FA Cup for the sixth time. The five goals in the replay made it the highest scoring FA Cup Final replay.

Match details

Replay

Cup final song
Tottenham's cup final song was "Ossie's dream", recorded by the musical duo Chas and Dave with the Tottenham squad. Argentine player Ossie Ardiles famously sang the line "In the cup for Tottingham".

References

External links
Report on the Final and Final Replay
Sporting Chronicle Team line-ups

FA Cup Finals
Final
FA Cup Final 1981
FA Cup Final 1981
FA Cup Final
FA Cup Final